Hilton Worldwide (legally Hilton Worldwide Holdings Inc.) is an American multinational hospitality company that manages and franchises a broad portfolio of hotels and resorts. Founded by Conrad Hilton in May 1919, the corporation is now led by Christopher J. Nassetta.

Hilton is headquartered in Tysons Corner, Virginia, United States. As of June 30, 2020, its portfolio includes 6,215 properties (including timeshare properties) with 983,465 rooms in 118 countries and territories, including 690 that are managed and 5,405 that are franchised, with the combined managed and franchised properties having a total of 953,946 rooms, in addition to 65 that are owned or leased including 57 that are wholly owned or leased, one owned by a consolidated non-wholly owned entity, two that are leased by consolidated variable interest entities (VIEs) and five that are owned or leased by unconsolidated affiliates. Prior to its December 2013 IPO, Hilton was ranked as the 36th largest private company in the United States by Forbes.

Hilton has 18 brands across different market segments, including Conrad Hotels & Resorts, Canopy by Hilton, Curio Collection by Hilton, Hilton Hotels & Resorts, DoubleTree by Hilton, Embassy Suites Hotels, Hilton Garden Inn, Hampton by Hilton, Homewood Suites by Hilton, Home2 Suites by Hilton, Hilton Grand Vacations, LXR Hotels and Resorts by Hilton, Waldorf Astoria Hotels & Resorts, Signia by Hilton, Tru by Hilton, Tapestry Collection by Hilton, Tempo by Hilton, Motto by Hilton and Spark by Hilton.

On December 12, 2013, Hilton again became a public company, raising an estimated $2.35 billion in its second IPO. At the time, The Blackstone Group held a 45.8 percent stake in the company. In October 2016, China's HNA Group agreed to acquire a 25 percent equity interest in Hilton from Blackstone. The transaction was expected to close in the first quarter of 2017. Hilton's largest stockholders were until mid 2018 HNA Group, Blackstone, and Wellington Management Group, which as of March 2017 owned 25%, 15.2%, and 6.7% of Hilton common stock respectively. Hilton Hotels are now a stand-alone company.

Hilton was founded by Conrad Hilton as Hilton Hotels Corporation in Cisco, Texas, in 1919 and had its headquarters in Beverly Hills, California, from 1969 until 2009. In August 2009, the company moved to Tysons Corner, unincorporated Fairfax County, Virginia, near McLean.

History 
In 1919, Conrad Hilton purchased his first hotel, the 40-room Mobley Hotel in Cisco, Texas, and bought additional Texas hotels as years passed.

In 1925, the Dallas Hilton became the first hotel to use the Hilton name. In 1927, Hilton expanded to Waco, Texas, where he opened the first hotel with air-conditioning in public areas and cold running water.

In 1943, Hilton assumed management of the Roosevelt Hotel and purchased the Plaza Hotel, both well-established high-end luxury hotels less than a mile apart in New York City's Midtown Manhattan neighborhood. With this pair of acquisitions Hilton established the first hospitality company to span the contiguous United States.

The company incorporated in 1946 as the Hilton Hotels Corporation, and subsequently began public trading of shares on the New York Stock Exchange. In 1947, the Roosevelt Hotel became the first hotel in the world to have televisions in its rooms.

In 1947, Hilton assumed management of the Palacio Hilton hotel in Chihuahua, Mexico, which became the chain's first international property. That same year, they assumed management of four hotels on the island of Bermuda.

Hilton International was founded as a wholly-owned subsidiary in 1948, just prior to the 1949 opening of the Caribe Hilton Hotel in Puerto Rico. Barman Ramon "Monchito" Marreno claimed he created the piña colada cocktail at this resort.  Hilton purchased The Waldorf-Astoria in New York in the same year.

In 1953, Hilton opened its first hotel in Europe, the Castellana Hilton in Madrid, Spain.

The Hotels Statler Company was acquired in 1954 for $111 million in what was then the world's most expensive real estate transaction. One year later, Hilton created the world's first central reservations office, titled "HILCRON". The reservations team in 1955 consisted of eight members on staff booking reservations for any of Hilton's then 28 hotels. Reservations agents used the "availability board" to track records. Bookings could be made for any Hilton via telephone, telegram, or Teletype.

Later in 1955, Hilton launched a program to ensure every hotel room would include air conditioning.

In late 1955, Hilton opened the Istanbul Hilton, the first post–World War II property in Istanbul, Turkey.

Hilton is credited with pioneering the airport hotel concept with the opening of the Hilton Inn at San Francisco International Airport in 1959.

International expansion continued in this era. In 1957, Hilton assumed management of its first hotel in Central America, the El Panama Hilton in Panama City, Panama. In 1958, Hilton opened its first hotel in Canada, The Queen Elizabeth in Montreal, Quebec. In 1959, Hilton opened its first hotel in Africa, the Nile Hilton in Cairo, Egypt. In 1960, Hilton opened its first hotel in Oceania, the Chevron Hilton in Sydney, Australia. In 1961, Hilton assumed management of its first hotel in South America, the Hotel Carrera in Santiago, Chile. In 1963, Hilton opened its first hotels in Asia, the Hong Kong Hilton and the Tokyo Hilton, and its first hotel in the Middle East, the Royal Tehran Hilton.

In 1965, Hilton launched Lady Hilton, the first hotel concept created specifically for women guests. To appeal to female travelers, a number of properties offered floors occupied by only women along with distinct amenities for their usage.

In 1969, the first DoubleTree Hotel opened. However, Hilton was not affiliated with the brand until its acquisition of the parent company in 1999.

Hilton purchased the Flamingo Las Vegas in 1970, which would become the first in the domestic gaming business to be listed on the NYSE.

In 1977, Hilton International opened its first property behind the "Iron Curtain" in Communist Europe, the Budapest Hilton.

In 1979, founder Conrad Hilton died at the age of 91. Hilton Hotels Corporation later created the Conrad Hotels brand in honor of Hilton.

Hilton Honors (formerly Hilton HHonors), the company's guest loyalty program, was initiated in 1987. In 1994, the Honors surpassed competing hotel loyalty programs by offering members both hotel credit points and airline credit miles.

The company has been a sponsor of the United States Olympic Team.

Two chains with one name 

The company spun off its international operations into a separately traded company on December 1, 1964, known as "Hilton International Co." It was acquired in 1967 by Trans World Corp., the holding company for Trans World Airlines. In 1986, it was sold to UAL Corp., the holding company for United Airlines, which became Allegis Corp. in an attempt to re-incarnate itself as a full-service travel company, encompassing Westin Hotels and Hertz rental cars in addition to Hilton International and United Airlines. In 1987, after a corporate putsch, the renamed UAL Corp. sold Hilton International to Ladbroke Group plc, a British leisure and gambling company, which, in May 1999, adopted the name "Hilton Group plc."

As a result, there were two separate, fully independent companies operating hotels under the Hilton name. Those Hilton Hotels outside the U.S. were, until 2006, styled as "Hilton International" hotels. Because the two chains were contractually forbidden to operate hotels in the other's territory under the Hilton name, for many years hotels run by Hilton International in the U.S. were called Vista International Hotels, while hotels operated by the American arm of Hilton outside the U.S. were named Conrad Hotels.

In 1997, to minimize longtime consumer confusion, the American and British Hilton companies adopted a joint marketing agreement under which they shared the same logos, promoted each other's brands and maintained joint reservation systems. At that point, the Vista chain was phased out, while Conrad has been restyled as one of the luxury brands of Hilton (along with the Waldorf-Astoria Collection) and operates hotels within the U.S. as well as abroad.

In 1971, Hilton acquired International Leisure Company, including the Las Vegas Hilton and Flamingo Hilton.

In 1998, Hilton spun off its gaming operations into a separate, publicly held company called Park Place Entertainment (later Caesars Entertainment, Inc.)

In 1999, Hilton acquired Promus Hotel Corporation, which included the DoubleTree, Red Lion, Embassy Suites, Hampton Inn, and Homewood Suites brands.

21st century 

In 2001, Hilton agreed to sell Red Lion to WestCoast Hospitality.

On December 29, 2005, Hilton Hotels Corporation agreed to re-acquire the Hilton International chain from its British owner, Hilton Group plc, for £3.3 billion ($5.71 billion). As well as bringing the two Hilton companies back together as a single entity, this deal also included Hilton plc properties operating as Conrad Hotels, Scandic Hotels and LivingWell Health Clubs. On February 23, 2006, the deal closed, making Hilton Hotels the world's fifth largest hotel operator in number of rooms.  Scandic Hotels was sold the next year on March 1 to EQT Partners.

On July 3, 2007, Hilton Hotels Corp. agreed to an all-cash buyout from the Blackstone Group LP in a $26 billion (including debt) deal that would make Blackstone the world's largest hotel owner. At $47.50 per share, the buyout price was 32 percent higher than the closing value of a share of Hilton stock on July 3. The deal was the culmination of a year of on and off discussions with Blackstone. In October 2007, Christopher J. Nassetta was appointed president and chief executive officer of Hilton. In February 2009, Hilton Hotels Corp. announced that its headquarters were moving from Beverly Hills, California to Fairfax County, Virginia.

While Blackstone saw an opportunity to streamline the company and push Hilton's expansion overseas when Blackstone pursued Hilton in 2006 and 2007, the buyout saddled the company with $20 billion of debt just as the economy was turning down. The debt had very liberal terms, so there was no danger of default, but when travel slowed, the company suffered. In April 2010, Hilton and Blackstone restructured the debt. Blackstone invested a further $800 million of equity and the debt was reduced to $16 billion.

Hilton returned to being a public company on December 12, 2013. This second IPO in the company's history raised an estimated $2.35 billion. The Blackstone Group retained a 45.8% stake in the company.

The company announced in February 2016 that Hilton would turn its hotel holdings into a real estate investment trust. Prior to making the announcement, the company went to the IRS for approval.

In February 2016, Hilton announced its intention to spin off its timeshare and real estate businesses, creating three independent public companies. The spin-offs of Park Hotels & Resorts and Hilton Grand Vacations were completed in January 2017. As of 2018, the company is a fully independent publicly traded company (just like in the pre-buyout days)  after the exits of Blackstone and HNA.

Brands 
Hilton uses several tiers to distinguish its properties. Hampton, Hilton, Doubletree and Garden Inn account for three-quarters of all Hilton Worldwide rooms.

Luxury 
 Waldorf Astoria Hotels & Resorts
 LXR Hotels & Resorts
 Conrad Hotels & Resorts

Upper Upscale 
 Hilton Hotels & Resorts
 Canopy by Hilton
 Curio Collection by Hilton
 Signia by Hilton
 DoubleTree by Hilton
 Embassy Suites by Hilton

Upscale 
 Tapestry Collection by Hilton
 Tempo by Hilton
 Hilton Garden Inn
 Homewood Suites by Hilton

Upper Midscale 
 Hampton by Hilton
 Motto by Hilton
 Home2 Suites by Hilton

Midscale 
 Tru by Hilton

Economy 

 Spark by Hilton

Timeshare 
 Hilton Grand Vacations

Former 
 Coral by Hilton
 Denizen Hotels
 Lady Hilton
 Scandic Hotels

Franchising 
As of June 30, 2020, about 98% of the rooms branded under Hilton were managed or franchised to independent operators and companies. During its 2007–2013 ownership of Hilton, Blackstone Group pursued a strategy of predominantly expanding Hilton's reach through franchise agreements, while relatively few new properties were actually operated by Hilton. Hence, the proportion of franchised rooms grew significantly during this period.  The practice of franchising is popular within the hospitality industry among most major hotel chains, as the parent company does not have to pay for the maintenance and overhead costs of franchised properties. Franchisees must follow strict brand standards in order to maintain a licensing agreement with Hilton. Many of Hilton's flagship properties, airport properties, and largest resorts, however, are corporately managed.

Hilton Honors 
Hilton Honors (formerly Hilton HHonors) is Hilton's guest loyalty program, through which frequent guests can accumulate points and airline miles by staying within the Hilton portfolio. The program is one of the largest of its type, with approximately 120 million members.  There are four levels of elite status within the Hilton Honors program including Member, Silver, Gold and Diamond. Hilton points average a value of .372¢ each.

Hilton renamed the Hilton HHonors program to Hilton Honors in February 2017.

Corporate affairs 
The company has its headquarters in Tysons Corner, Virginia and an operations center in Memphis. Its Asia-Pacific operations are managed out of Singapore, its Middle East and Africa operations are managed out of Dubai, and its European operations are based in Watford, UK.

Company culture 
According to Careerbliss.com, Hilton ranked first in the list of "2012 Happiest Companies in America", with a score of 4.36 out of 5. The survey looked at job reviews from more than 100,000 employees, with such characteristics life as work-life balance, company culture and reputation, and the relationships employees have with their bosses.  Hilton has scored 100% on the Corporate Equality Index each year from 2014 to 2017.

In 2016, Hilton was named one of the "World's 25 Best Multinational Workplaces" by Fortune and Great Place to Work. In 2017, Fortune ranked Hilton number 26 in their list of "The 100 Best Companies to Work For". In 2019, Fortune ranked Hilton number 1 in their list of "The 100 Best Companies to Work For".

Gallery

Hilton in popular culture 

 Keith Richards and Mick Jagger performed in the East Penthouse on the 45th floor of the New York Hilton on October 28, 1965.
 On the rotating wheel space station in Stanley Kubrick's 1968 film 2001: A Space Odyssey, a receptionist is shown sitting at the entrance to the Hilton Space Station 5.
 John Lennon and Yoko Ono honeymooned in the presidential suite at the Hilton Amsterdam, where they hosted one of their famous "Bed-Ins" for a full week in 1969.
 In 1971, Diamonds Are Forever was filmed at the Las Vegas Hilton.
 On April 3, 1973, Dr. Martin Cooper made the world's first cell phone call in front of the New York Hilton Midtown. A press conference was held at the hotel later that day to mark the milestone.
 In 1976, during a music tour, Ike and Tina Turner were staying at the Statler Hilton (now the Statler Hotel & Residences) in downtown Dallas when Tina decided to leave Ike.  Her moments of getting away from Ike and fleeing the hotel were included in her book I, Tina and in the movie What's Love Got to Do with It.
 The Bodyguard with Whitney Houston and Kevin Costner was filmed at the Fontainebleau Hilton in Miami in 1992. On February 11, 2012, Houston died in her bathtub in Suite 434 of the Beverly Hilton after a drug overdose. Hotel management has since renovated the room.
 In 1995, the James Bond movie GoldenEye was filmed at the Langham Hilton.
 The Insider was filmed in 1999 at the Seelbach Hilton.
 In 2006, several movies including Spider-Man 3, Michael Clayton, and American Gangster were filmed at the New York Hilton.
 Conrad Hilton (played by actor Chelcie Ross) features as a major character in the third season of Mad Men, as lead character Don Draper creates a series of ad campaigns for Hilton Hotels. The Drapers travel during one episode to the Cavalieri Hilton in Rome, though the scenes were actually shot at the Dorothy Chandler Pavilion in Los Angeles.

See also

References

External links 

 

 
1919 establishments in Texas
Companies based in McLean, Virginia
Hospitality companies established in 1919
Hospitality companies
Companies listed on the New York Stock Exchange
Hotel chains in the United States
Private equity portfolio companies
2013 initial public offerings